Riverside Century Plaza Main Tower is a 66-story, 275-metre (902 ft) skyscraper in Wuhu, Anhui, China. Completed in 2015, it is the tallest building in Wuhu.

See also
List of tallest buildings in China

References

Buildings and structures in Wuhu
Skyscrapers in Anhui
Skyscraper office buildings in China
Skyscraper hotels in China
2015 establishments in China
Office buildings completed in 2015